Following the independence of Nauru, the flag of Nauru was raised for the first time. The flag, chosen in a local design competition, was adopted on independence day, 31 January 1968. The design symbolically depicts Nauru's geographical position, with a star just south of the Equator.

Proportions and symbolism
The flag reflects the geographical location of the island nation.

The stripe along with the star signifies the location of the island in the Pacific Ocean one degree south of the Equator. The separation of the blue flag cloth into two equal parts recalls the saga, that the first inhabitants were to have been brought to Earth from two boulders.

Nauru itself is symbolised by a white 12-pointed star. The twelve points on the star represent the island's twelve original tribes. The following twelve tribes are:

Deiboe
Eamwidara
Eamwit
Eamwitmwit
Eano
Eaoru
Emangum
Emea
Irutsi
Iruwa
Iwi
Ranibok

The blue signifies the Pacific Ocean, while the white colour of the star represents phosphate, a former major natural resource of the country.

Construction Sheet

Creation and adoption
The flag was created by a resident employed by the Australian flag manufacturer Evans. It was officially adopted on 31 January 1968. Unlike some flags of Pacific nations (e.g., that of Tuvalu), Nauru's flag has evoked little controversy.

Other flags of Nauru

Historical flags of Nauru

See also
Coat of arms of Nauru
Nauru graph, named after its resemblance to the 12-pointed star on the flag
Flag of Curaçao

References

Flags introduced in 1968
Flag
National flags
1968 establishments in Nauru